The men's pole vault at the 2010 African Championships in Athletics was held on July 31.

Results

External links
Results

Pole
Pole vault at the African Championships in Athletics